William Pullar (11 April 1900 – 17 January 1954) was a Scottish professional footballer who made over 290 appearances as an outside right in the Scottish League for Cowdenbeath. He also played for Leith Athletic and Raith Rovers.

Personal life 
Pullar served in the British Army during the First World War.

Career statistics

Honours 
Cowdenbeath

 Scottish League Second Division second-place promotion: 1923–24

Individual

Cowdenbeath Hall of Fame

References 

Scottish footballers
Cowdenbeath F.C. players
Scottish Football League players
Association football outside forwards
Leith Athletic F.C. players
Raith Rovers F.C. players
British Army personnel of World War I
Footballers from Edinburgh
1900 births
1954 deaths
Dalkeith Thistle F.C. players